The Villa di Montevettolini is a Medici villa in the comune of Monsummano Terme, Tuscany, central Italy.

History
Also called Monte Veturino, the villas was built after 1595 by commission of Grand Duke Ferdinand I of Tuscany on a high hill at the feet of Monte Albano, where a large hunting reserve (the so-called Parco Reale) was located. The architect was Gherardo Mechini, a pupil of Bernardo Buontalenti, who included some pre-existing structures from the medieval borough, such as a fortress and a stretch of walls. The building was finished with the 1620s. The result was a villa with a severe and compact appearance, with a polygonal plan, resembling more a defensive fortress than a patrician residence. It was used as administrative base for the Medici estates in the area.

The villa was depicted by Giusto Utens in a series of lunettes portraying the Medici villas. The building was frequently used by Ferdinand I; his grandson Ferdinand II sold it in 1650, together with its surrounding lands to the Bartolomei family. In 1871 it was acquired by prince Marcantonio Borghese: also owner of the Villa Medici di Cafaggiolo, he restored it. In 2019, the Borghese family still owns the site.

Sources

Montevettolini
Houses completed in the 17th century
Villas in Tuscany